Budge Budge is a town and a municipality of the South 24 Parganas district in the Indian state of West Bengal. It is situated on the eastern banks of the Hooghly River. It is a part of the area covered by the Kolkata Metropolitan Development Authority (KMDA).

Geography

Area overview
Alipore Sadar subdivision is the most urbanized part of the South 24 Parganas district. 59.85% of the population lives in the urban areas and 40.15% lives in the rural areas. In the northern portion of the subdivision (shown in the map alongside) there are 21 census towns. The entire district is situated in the Ganges Delta and the subdivision, on the east bank of the Hooghly River, is an alluvial stretch, with industrial development.

Note: The map alongside presents some of the notable locations in the subdivision. All places marked in the map are linked in the larger full screen map.

Location

Balarampur, Uttar Raypur, Buita, Benjanhari Acharial, Abhirampur and Nischintapur form a cluster of census towns around Budge Budge and Pujali, as per the map of the Budge Budge I CD block on the page number 167 in the District Census Handbook 2011 for the South 24 Parganas district.

Climate
Köppen-Geiger climate classification system classifies its climate as tropical wet and dry (Aw).

Demographics

According to the 2011 Census of India, Budge Budge had a total population of 76,837, of which 39,510 were males and  37,327 were females. There were 6,946 people in the age range of 0 to 6 years. The total number of literate people was 59,504, which constituted 77.4% of the population with male literacy of 81.2% and female literacy of 73.5%. The effective literacy (7+) of population over 6 years of age was 85.1%, of which male literacy rate was 89.1% and female literacy rate was 81.0%. The Scheduled Castes and Scheduled Tribes population was 7,015 and 103 respectively. Budge Budge had a total of 18,055 households as of 2011.

According to the 2001 Census of India, Budge Budge had a total population of 81,554. Males constitute 55% of the population and females 45%. It has an average literacy rate of 70%, higher than the national average of 59.5%: male literacy is 75%, and female literacy is 64%. 10% of the population is under 6 years of age.

Kolkata Urban Agglomeration
The following municipalities and census towns in the South 24 Parganas district were part of the Kolkata Urban Agglomeration in the 2011 census: Maheshtala (M), Joka (CT), Balarampur (CT), Chata Kalikapur (CT), Budge Budge (M), Nischintapur (CT), Uttar Raypur (CT), Pujali (M) and Rajpur Sonarpur (M).

Civic administration

Municipality
It has jurisdiction over parts of the Budge Budge. It is divided into 20 wards. According to the 2022 municipal election, it is being controlled by the All India Trinamool Congress.

Police station
It has jurisdiction over parts of the Budge Budge and Pujali municipalities, and the Budge Budge I and Budge Budge II CD blocks.

Economy
Over the past few years Budge Budge has developed considerably in terms of lifestyle and infrastructure. Major projects include Calcutta Riverside, widening of the Budge Budge Trunk (BBT) Road and the starting of the 7.7 km Batanagar Flyover from Jinjira Bazar to Batanagar.

Budge Budge owes much of its importance to the port, oil storage and jute mills. Being close to Kolkata and on the shores of the Hooghly River makes it a strategic location for oil storage and is the biggest oil storage for the metropolis Calcutta with big PSUs like Petroleum Wharves Budge Budge under Kolkata Port Trust. BPCL, HPCL, IOC having large units there. Jute mills were the biggest employers in the area till they started falling sick. Prominent among them are New Central Jute Mill and Budge Budge Jute Mills. At their height before 1971 these jute mills used to employ thousands of workers (New Central Jute Mills has been said to have employed as many as twenty thousand people) but after the partition of India and the subsequent creation of Bangladesh, supply of raw materials for these jute mills decreased. This, along with failure of trade unions lead to the closing of most of these jute mills.

The Budge Budge Thermal Power Station set up by CESC in Achipur (named after a Chinese called Achhu saheb by the locals who had established a sugar cane unit there) is a major source of electricity for Kolkata and its suburbs.

Transport
Budge Budge is on the Budge Budge Trunk Road.

Budge Budge railway station is on the Sealdah–Budge Budge line of the Kolkata Suburban Railway system.

Commuters
With the electrification of the railways, suburban traffic has grown tremendously since the 1960s. As of 2005–2006, more than 1.7 million (17 lakhs) commuters use the Kolkata Suburban Railway system daily. After the partition of India, refugees from East Pakistan/ Bangladesh had a strong impact on the development of urban areas in the periphery of Kolkata. The new immigrants depended on Kolkata for their livelihood, thus increasing the number of commuters. Eastern Railway runs 1,272 EMU trains daily.

Education
 Budge Budge College, established in 1971, is affiliated with the University of Calcutta. It offers honours courses in Bengali, English, Sanskrit, history, political science, philosophy, economics, geography, education, mathematics and accounting & finance, and general degree courses in arts, science, and accounting & finance.
 Budge Budge Institute of Technology, established in 2009, offers diploma, undergraduate and postgraduate degree courses in Engineering and Technology and other allied fields.

Healthcare
Budge Budge ESI Hospital, with 300 beds, is the major government medical facility in the Budge Budge.

References

External links
 

Cities and towns in South 24 Parganas district
Neighbourhoods in Kolkata
Kolkata Metropolitan Area